Maximilian Steinbauer (born 29 April 2001) is a professional footballer who plays as a defender for Thai League 1 club Sukhothai. Born in Germany, he represents the Thailand U-23.

Club career

Muangthong United
Before the second half of 2020–21, Steinbauer signed for Thai top flight side Muangthong United.

Sukhothai
In 2021, he signed for Sukhothai in the Thai second tier, helping them earn promotion to the Thai top flight.

International career
Steinbauer is eligible to represent Thailand internationally through his mother.

References

External links
 

Living people
2001 births
German people of Thai descent
German footballers
Association football defenders
Regionalliga players
Maximilian Steinbauer
Maximilian Steinbauer
Maximilian Steinbauer
Maximilian Steinbauer
Tennis Borussia Berlin players
German expatriate footballers
German expatriate sportspeople in Thailand
Expatriate footballers in Thailand